Marawara (Marah Warah) is a village and the center of Marawara district, Kunar Province, Afghanistan.

References

External links

Marawara